This is a list of persons with the surname Lee.

A
 Agnes Lee, American poet
 Alan Lee (footballer), Irish footballer
 Albert Lee, English guitarist
 Alma Lee (1914–2000), Swiss-born naturalised British philatelist
 Alvin Lee (1944–2013), born Graham Barnes, English guitarist and lead singer of the band Ten Years After
 Amasa Coleman Lee, American politician
 Amos Lee, American singer
 Amy Lee, American singer
 Amy Freeman Lee, American artist, writer and lecturer
 Anders Lee (born 1990), American ice hockey player
 Andy Lee (American football), American football punter for the San Francisco 49ers of the NFL
 Andy Lee (Korean singer), rapper/singer from boyband Shinhwa
 Ang Lee, Oscar-winning Taiwanese film director
 Ann Lee, leader of the Shaker movement
 Ann Lee (actress) (1918–2003), American businesswoman and actress
 Ann Lee (illustrator), botanical, insect and bird illustrator
 Ann Lee (singer), English pop singer
 Anna Lee, English actress, was on General Hospital, real name Joan Boniface Winnifrith
 Annabelle Lee, All-American Girls Professional Baseball League pitcher
 Anne Carter Lee, daughter of Robert E. Lee
 Anne Hill Carter Lee, First Lady of Virginia
 Arthur Lee, several people
 Auriol Lee, English actress, stage director and producer

B
 Barbara Lee, U.S. Representative from California's 9th congressional district
 Benjamin W. Lee, Korean American theoretical physicist
 Bernard Lee, actor best known for portraying M in the James Bond films
 Bill Lee (author), Chinese-American writer and ex-member of the Joe Boys
 Bill Lee (left-handed pitcher), Major League Baseball pitcher
 Bill Lee (musician), American musician
 Bill Lee (right-handed pitcher), Major League Baseball player from 1934 to 1947
 Bobby Lee, comedian on MADtv
 Brandon Lee, Chinese-American actor and son of Bruce Lee
Brandun Lee (born 1999), American boxer of Korean and Mexican descent
 Brenda Lee, American singer
 Brenko Lee, Australian rugby league player
 Brett Lee, Australian cricketer
 Brian Lee (disambiguation), several people
 Brodie Lee, American wrestler
 Brooks Lee, American baseball player
 Bruce Lee, Hong Kong actor and martial artist, son of Lee Hoi-chuen
 Bruce George Peter Lee, prolific British serial killer, arsonist, and mass murderer

C
 Charles Lee (Attorney General), United States Attorney General
 Charles Lee (general), general in the American Revolutionary War
 Charlie Lee (computer scientist), inventor of Litecoin
 Christopher Lee (1922–2015), English actor
 Cliff Lee, Major League Baseball pitcher
 Coco Lee, American singer
 Courtney Lee, NBA player
 Lee Chia-hao (born 1999), Taiwanese badminton player

D
 Damion Lee, American basketball player
 Daniel Lee, several people
 David Lee, several people
 Dennis Lee, several people
 Derrek Lee, American baseball player
 Derrick Todd Lee, American serial killer
 Desmond Lee, Singaporean Cabinet Minister and Lawyer
 Don Lee or Donald Lee, several people
 Dorothy Lee, several people
 Dylan Lee (born 1994), American baseball player

E
 Ed Lee (1952–2017), American attorney and mayor of San Francisco, California
 Edrick Lee (born 1992), Australian rugby league player
 Edwin Gray Lee (1836–1870), Confederate brigadier general in the American Civil War
 El Franco Lee (1949–2016), American politician
 Eleanor Agnes Lee (1841–1873), American diarist, poet, and daughter of Robert E. Lee
 Erica Lee (1888–1981), English sculptor
 Euna Lee (born 1972), South Korean-born American journalist for Current TV
 Evan Lee (disambiguation), several people
 Everett Lee (1916–2022), American conductor and violinist

F
 Fitzhugh Lee, general, diplomat, and Governor of Virginia
 Floyd Lee, American blues musician
 Francis Lee (disambiguation), several people
 Frankie Lee (musician) (1941–2015), American soul blues and electric blues singer and songwriter

G
 G. Avery Lee (1916–2008), Baptist preacher in New Orleans
 Gary A. Lee (1933–2022), American politician
 Geddy Lee, Canadian rock music bass guitarist and singer
 George Lee (disambiguation), several people
 Gordon Lee (footballer), English footballer and football manager
 Graham Lee (musician), Australian rock musician and record producer
 Graham Lee (jockey), horse jockey in Ireland and the United Kingdom
 Greg Lee (basketball), American basketball player

H
 Hacken Lee, Hong Kong singer and actor
 Hannah Harrison Ludwell Lee, American colonist
 Harold B. Lee, 11th President of The Church of Jesus Christ of Latter-day Saints
 Harper Lee, American novelist
 Harry Lee (sheriff) (1932–2007), Chinese-American sheriff of Jefferson Parish, Louisiana
 Henry Lee (disambiguation), several people
 Lee Heung-kam, Hong Kong actress
 Hubert L. Lee, American Medal of Honor recipient

I
Inkyu Lee, Korean engineer

J
 Jae Lee, comic book artist
 James Lee, several people
 Jason Lee (field hockey), English field hockey player and coach
 Jason Lee (actor), American actor
 Jason Scott Lee (born 1966), Asian American film actor
 Jeanette Lee (born 1971), American pocket billiards player, a.k.a. "The Black Widow"
 Jeannette Lee, British music record executive, former member of Public Image Ltd; co-owner of Rough Trade Records
 Jeannette H. Lee, founder of Sytel, Inc.
 Jennie Lee (American actress), American stage and silent film actress
 Jennie Lee (British actress), British stage actress
 Jim Lee, Korean American comic book artist and publisher
 John A. Lee, New Zealand politician and writer
 John B. Lee, Canadian author and poet who is presently Poet Laureate of Brantford, Ontario
 John 'Babbacombe' Lee, English murderer
 John C. H. Lee, U.S. Army General
 John Joseph Lee, Irish Historian and former Senator
 John Lee (Australian actor), Australian actor
 John Lee (astronomer), English philanthropist, astronomer, mathematician, antiquarian and barrister
 John Lee (blues musician), (1915–1977) American country blues musician 
 John Lee (British actor), British actor
 John Lee (government official), Hong Kong politician, former police officer and Chief Executive
 John Lee (Labour politician), retired Labour politician in the United Kingdom
 John Lee (pathologist), English consultant histopathologist at Rotherham General Hospital
 John Lee (university principal), Principal of the University of Edinburgh from 1840 to 1859
 John Lee, Baron Lee of Trafford, British Liberal Democrat politician
 John L. G. Lee (1869–1952), American politician and lawyer
 John Rafter Lee, actor/voice actor, best known for his portrayal of Trevor Goodchild in Peter Chung's Æon Flux
 Johnson Lee, Hong Kong entertainer
 Jong Ho Lee, Korean engineer
 Jonna Lee, Swedish singer
 Joseph Lee, Scottish poet, journalist and artist

K
 Kai-Fu Lee, American information technology executive and founding president of Google China
 Kam Lee, American death metal Massacre singer
 Keiran Lee, British pornographic actor, director and producer
 Khalil Lee, American baseball player
 Kieran Lee, English footballer for Sheffield Wednesday F.C.
 Korey Lee, American baseball player

L
 Laetitia Corbin Lee, American colonist
 Larisa Lee, Australian politician
 Larry Lee (baseball), American college baseball coach
 Lauranett Lee, American historian, educator, and curator
 Laurie Lee, English poet, novelist, and screenwriter
 Leapy Lee, English pop singer
 Lee Chaerin, also known as CL, leader of South Korean pop group 2NE1
 Lee Chang-ho, Korean Go player
 Lee Chong Wei, Malaysian badminton player
 Lee Donghae, member of Korean pop group Super Junior
 Lee Eun-ju, Korean actress
 Lee Eung-kyung, Korean actress
 Lee Hoi-chuen, Cantonese Opera singer and actor, father of Bruce Lee
 Lee Howon, Korean rapper, singer, dancer of boyband Infinite
 Lee Hsien Loong, third Prime Minister of Singapore
 Lee Hsien Yang, Singaporean Businessman and former Brigadier-General
 Lee Hyori, Korean pop singer
 Lee Hyukjae, Korean comedian
 Lee Jae-Dong, professional StarCraft player
 Lee Jang-woo, Korean actor and singer
 Lee Ji-ah, Korean actress
 Lee Jinki, known by stage name Onew, leader and vocalist of South Korean boy band SHINee
 Lee Jong-hyun, member of Korean boy band CNBLUE
 Lee Joon, member of Korean boy band MBLAQ
 Lee Jun-ho (entertainer), member of Korean pop group 2PM
 Lee Kong Chian, Chinese businessman and philanthropist
 Lee Kuan Yew, first Prime Minister of Singapore
 Lee Min-ho (born 1987), South Korean actor and singer best known for his role in Boys Over Flowers
 Lee Min-ho (actor born 1993), Korean actor
 Lee Min-hyuk, Korean singer, rapper, member of boy band BtoB
 Lee Min-hyuk, South Korean singer, member of boy band Monsta X
 Lee Shau-kee, Hong Kong billionaire businessman
 Lee Soon-Kyu, Korean singer
 Lee Seunghyun, also known as Seungri, Korean singer and dancer, member of boyband Big Bang
 Lee Seung-gi, Korean actor and singer
 Lee Sungjong, Korean singer, member of boyband Infinite
 Lee Sungmin, member of Korean pop group Super Junior
 Lee Sungyeol, Korean Singer, member of boyband Infinite
 Lee Taemin, Korean singer, dancer, member of boy band SHINee
 Lee Tae Sung, Korean actor
 Lee Teng-hui, first democratically elected President of the Republic of China
 Lee Toong Leon, Malaysian businessman
 Lee Wei Ling, Singaporean Neurologist 
 Lee Yock Suan, former Singaporean Cabinet Minister 
 Lee Yong-dae, Korean badminton player
 Lee family, Singaporean political family
 Lee-Hamblin family, U.S. political family
 Leonard Lee, Canadian entrepreneur
 Leonard Leroy Lee, birthname of American actor Robert Fuller 
 Leonidas Lee, Major League Baseball player in 1877
 Lettice Lee, colonial American socialite
 Lila Lee, American actress
 Linda Lee (bridge), Canadian bridge player
 Liz Lee, American politician from Minnesota
 Louise Lee, Hong Kong actress
 Loziene J. Lee, American politician

M
 Mark Lee, Canadian television sportscaster
 Mark Lee, Canadian entertainer and member of K-pop boy group NCT
 Mark Lee Kok Huang, Singaporean comedian, actor, television host and film director
 Martin Lee, founding chairman of the Hong Kong Democratic Party
 Martin Lee Ka-shing, director of Hong Kong and China Gas
 Mary Lee, several people
 Matthew Lee (wrestler), Canadian professional wrestler
 Matty Lee, British Olympic diver
 Maureen Lee (1932–2020), British writer
 McDowell Lee, American politician
 Mela Lee, American voice actress
 Mike Lee, U.S. Senator from Utah
 Mildred Childe Lee, daughter of Robert E. Lee
 Monte Lee, American college baseball coach
 Muna Lee, American Olympic sprinter

N
 Nelson Lee, professional name of Richard Nelson Lee (1806–1872), English actor, theatre manager and dramatist
 Noël Lee, American classical pianist and composer living in Paris

O
 Opal Lee, described by AARP as grandmother of Juneteenth (June 19, USA)
 Otho S. Lee (1840–1918), American politician and lawyer
 Oudious Lee, American football player

P
 Paris Lee, basketball player
 Patrick Lee (disambiguation), several people
 Paul Lee (disambiguation), several people
 Peggy Lee (1920–2002), American singer
 Peter Lee, vice-chairman and managing director of Henderson Land Development
 Phillip Lee (disambiguation), several people
 Pinky Lee, American comic and 1950s children's TV host
 Poy Gum Lee, Chinese-American architect

Q
 Quentin Oliver Lee, American actor

R
 Ralph Lee, American puppet-maker
 Rex E. Lee, U.S. Solicitor General
 Richard Lee (disambiguation), several people
 Rita Lee, Brazilian (with American ancestry) Rock singer/composer
 Rob Lee, English footballer
 Robert Lee, Hong Kong musician, younger brother of Bruce Lee
 Robert E. Lee, Confederate general in the American Civil War
 Robert E. Lee, American playwright
 Ruta Lee, American actress and dancer, real name Ruta Mary Kilmonis

S
 Sam Lee, Hong Kong actor
 Sammy Lee (footballer), English football player and manager
 Samuel Phillips Lee, Union admiral in the American Civil War
 Sean Lee, American football linebacker for the Penn State University football team
 Shane Lee, former Australian cricketer
 Sheila Jackson Lee, U.S. Representative from Texas's 18th congressional district
 Sheryl Lee, American actress
 Simon Lee (disambiguation), several people
 Sondra Lee (born 1930), American actress and dancer
 Sook-Yin Lee, Canadian musician, filmmaker, actor and media personality
 Sophie Lee, Australian actress
 Spencer Lee, American freestyle and folkstyle wrestler
 Spike Lee, African-American movie director
 Stan Lee, American comic book writer, editor, former president and chairman of Marvel Comics
 Stephen Lee (disambiguation), several people
 Steven Lee (disambiguation), several people
 Stewart Lee, English comedian and writer
 Stewart Lee (cricketer), English cricketer
 Sunisa Lee (born 2003), American gymnast
 Lee Soonkyu, Korean popstar known as Sunny Lee
 Suk-chae Lee, Korean businessman

T
 Ta Sung Lee, Taiwanese engineer
 Terry Lee (cricketer), Australian cricketer and oenologist
 Tim Berners-Lee, English inventor of the World Wide Web and director of World Wide Web Consortium
 Lee Tim-shing, Hong Kong television producer
 Tommy Lee, American heavy metal musician

U
 Ulysses G. Lee (1913–1969), American soldier and professor

V
Vernon Lee, pseudonym of British writer Violet Paget (1856–1935)
Vincent Lee Chuan Leong, Singaporean kidnapper

W
 William Lee (American judge), American judge and Alabama state legislator 
 William C. Lee, American U.S. Army soldier and general
 William Henry Fitzhugh Lee, Confederate cavalry general, planter, and member of the U.S. Congress
 Willis A. Lee, Jr., U.S. Navy admiral in World War II
 Wynne Lee (born 1997), suspect in the killing of Aiden Leos

Y
 Yong Lee, American political scientist
 Young-Pyo Lee, South Korean footballer
 Yuan Tseh Lee, Taiwanese chemist and Nobel prize winner in chemistry 1986

Fictional characters
 Annabel Lee, title character in Edgar Allan Poe's 1849 elegiac poem
 Bill Lee (Stargate), in the science fiction television series Stargate SG-1
 Chief Inspector Lee, played by Jackie Chan in the Rush Hour film series
 Gaeun Lee, a protagonist in the anime series  
 Jann Lee, in the Dead or Alive video game series
 Juniper Lee, from the animated series The Life and Times of Juniper Lee
 Michelle Lee (NCIS), from American TV series NCIS
 Nelson Lee (detective), detective in British story papers, created in 1894
 Rock Lee, from the anime/manga series Naruto
 Lee Chaolan, in the Tekken games
 Lee Rosen, a main character in the TV Series Alphas

Other
 List of people with the Korean family name Lee
 Lee (English surname), a common English surname
 Lee (Chinese surname) or Li, several Chinese surnames
 Lee (surname 李) or Li (Hanzi ), a common Chinese surname
 Lee (surname 利) or Li (Hanzi ), a common Chinese surname
 Lee (Korean surname) or Rhee or Yi (Hanja , Hangul  or ), a common Korean surname derived from the Chinese ( "Lee" or "Li")
 Vaughan-Lee

See also
Lee (given name)
Lee (disambiguation)

Lists of people by surname